Degi Imranovich Bagayev (May 27, 1942 – May 25, 2015) was an honored trainer of the USSR and the first of the Chechens to have received this high rank.

Serious sport, freestyle wrestling, began for Bagayev with 15 years in Kazakhstan, where he stayed with his family during the deportation of the Chechens and Ingush. In the 1960s he was a medalist for Russia, the master of sports and into the national team of the Kazakh Republic. In this team, he brought many victories. After this, Bagayev was sent to Moscow for higher coaching courses. He continued to serve on the carpet: in 1964, was a medalist of the USSR, was included in the national team for the Olympic Games in Tokyo (unfortunately, he missed the games due to injury). Since 1965 Bagayev began coaching in Grozny. Specialists have noted his exceptional pedagogical talent. Already in 1969 one of his students became the national champion among the boys. In 1973, half of the Russian national team in wrestling were his disciples. The national team of Chechen-Ingushetia, whose coach was D. Bagaev, achieved outstanding results in the Games of the Peoples of the USSR in 1979. Athletes have won then 4 gold, 1 silver and 3 bronze medals.

Among the students of Bagayev: world and European champion Aslambek Bisultanov, world champion Hassan Ortsuev, four-time world champion Salman Hashimikov, world champion and Olympic silver medalist in Seoul Adlan Varayev, European champion and winner of world championships Tarhan Magomedov, world champion Alexander Muzykashvili. Thirty years Bagayev coached in Grozny. In 1995, the Russian Olympic Committee invited him to work in Moscow. Now Bagayev a senior manager of one of the sports schools of the Russian capital. He has more than one hundred students, many from Chechnya. Among them there are many budding teens winners of various youth sports.

References

External links 
 Nur.kz. Казахстанские корни чеченской борьбы 

1942 births
2015 deaths
Sportspeople from Grozny
Honoured Coaches of Russia
Merited Coaches of the Soviet Union
Recipients of the Order of the Red Banner of Labour
Chechen martial artists
Chechen people
Russian people of Chechen descent
Russian wrestlers